The V Amphibious Corps (VAC) was a formation of the United States Marine Corps which was composed of the 3rd, 4th and 5th Marine Divisions in World War II. The three divisions were the amphibious landing force for the United States Fifth Fleet with two goals, removal of Japanese forces from islands so U.S. Seabees could build advance bases to project US power.  In doing this VAC was notably involved in the battles for Tarawa, Saipan, and Iwo Jima.  V Amphibious Corps was commanded by General Holland 'Howlin Mad' Smith followed by General Harry Schmidt.

History

The V Amphibious Corps (formerly Amphibious Corps, Pacific Fleet; ACPF) was formed on 25 August 1943 at Camp Elliot, California. In September 1943, it moved to Pearl Harbor, Hawaii.

Structure
The structure of a United States Marine Corps' amphibious corps by 1945, was broken down into four major subordinate commands with each of them having numerous sub-elements:
 The first major element of the Corps was three reinforced Marine infantry divisions. 
 The second was the Corps artillery, which was composed of a field artillery group made of three battalions of 155mm howitzers, three battalions of 155mm guns, and an Antiaircraft Artillery Group made of three antiaircraft artillery battalions. 
 The third was the Amphibian Tractor Group, which was made up of four amphibian tractor battalions and an armored amphibian tractor battalion. 
 The fourth was the Corps Troops, which was composed of a headquarters and service battalion, administrative command, signal battalion, medical battalion, motor transport battalion, engineer battalion, reconnaissance battalion, and military police battalion.

Subordinate units
The US Marine Corps, US Army, and Naval Construction Force  commands that served under the V Amphibious Corps in World War II include:

Marine Corps
2nd Marine Division
3rd Marine Division
4th Marine Division
5th Marine Division
22nd Marine Regiment
Amphibious Reconnaissance Battalion [formerly "Company"]
Army
XXIV Corps Artillery
7th Infantry Division
27th Infantry Division
32nd Infantry Division
Navy
6th Naval Construction Brigade (Tinian and Saipan)
9th Naval Construction Brigade (Iwo Jima)

Command and Staff

Corps Commanders

 General Holland M. Smith: 25 August 1943 – 11 July 1944
 General Harry Schmidt: 12 July 1944 – 15 February 1946 (Deactivation)

Chiefs of Staff

 Brigadier General Graves B. Erskine: August 1943 - August 1944
 Brigadier General William W. Rogers: August 1944 - December 1945
 Brigadier General Dudley S. Brown: December 1945 - February 1946

Corps Artillery

Brigadier general Thomas E. Bourke
Colonel John S. Letcher (July 1944 - June 1945)

Personnel Officers

Lieutenant Colonel Albert F. Metze
Colonel David A. Stafford (October 1944 - February 1946)

Intelligence Officers

Lieutenant Colonel St. Julien R. Marshall: August 1943 - October 1944
Colonel Thomas R. Yancey (USA)

Operations Officers

Colonel John C. McQueen (August 1943 - August 1944)
Colonel Edward A. Craig (August 1944 - April 1945)
Colonel Walter W. Wensinger (April 1945 - February 1946)

Logistics Officers

Colonel Raymond E. Knapp (August 1943 - April 1944)
Colonel William F. Brown

Unit awards

A unit citation or commendation is an award bestowed upon an organization for the action cited. Members of the unit who participated in said actions are allowed to wear on their uniforms the appropriate ribbon of the awarded unit citation. V Amphibious Corps has been awarded the following:

See also

 Marine Air-Ground Task Force
 History of the United States Marine Corps
 Organization of the United States Marine Corps

References

Sources

Further reading

05
Military units and formations established in 1943
Inactive units of the United States Marine Corps
Corps of the United States Marine Corps
Military units and formations of the United States Marine Corps in World War II